Kaarel Eenpalu's second government was in office from 9 May 1938 to 12 October 1939, when it was succeeded by Jüri Uluots' cabinet.

Kaarel Eenpalu - Prime Minister
Artur Tupits - Acting Prime Minister (from 11 May 1938), Minister of Agriculture
Aleksander Jaakson - Minister of Public Education
Albert Assor - Minister of Justice
Leo Sepp - Minister of Economic Affairs
Richard Veermaa - Minister of Interior
Oskar Kask - Minister of Social Affairs
Paul Lill - Minister of War
Nikolai Viitak - Minister of Communications
Karl Selter - Minister of Foreign Affairs
Ants Oidermaa - (from 30 January 1939) minister, Head of the State Propaganda Service

See also
Kaarel Eenpalu's first cabinet (1932)

Cabinets of Estonia